The Egg is a performing arts venue in Albany, New York. Named for its shape, the building was designed by Harrison & Abramovitz as part of the Empire State Plaza project, and built between 1966 and 1978. It is located in the northeast corner of the Plaza. It has become an icon of New York's Capital District due to its unusual shape and central location. The Egg is owned by the state of New York and managed by the Nelson A. Rockefeller Empire State Plaza Performing Arts Center Corporation a not-for-profit that was created in 1979 to manage the performing arts facility in the Empire State Plaza. The Ellen Sinopoli Dance Company, a modern dance performing arts group, has been the resident company at the Egg for 28 years. The Egg is the summer home of the Ajkun Ballet Theatre, a New York City based professional company, since the year 2000

Organization
The Nelson A. Rockefeller Empire State Plaza Performing Arts Center Corporation is governed by an 11-member board of directors. The board is chosen by the New York State Governor, the New York State Senate, the New York State Assembly, the Albany County Executive, and also has a member from the New York State Office of General Services. In 2017, the corporation had operating expenses of $1.96 million and a staffing level of 43 people.

Structure 
The Egg is slightly inclined, and has a small pedestal on which it appears to sit. In fact, the building is held by a stem that goes down six stories into the Plaza. Attached to this stem is a concrete girdle that surrounds The Egg, enabling it to retain its shape and transmitting its weight to the pedestal. The building's organic shape reflects Nelson Rockefeller's original goal of architectural design that uses the fine artistic elements of sculpture.

The Egg houses two theaters, the 450-seat Lewis A. Swyer Theatre and the 982-seat Kitty Carlisle Hart Theatre. It draws many performing acts to Albany, including music, dance, and traditional stage presentations. The Ellen Sinopoli Dance Company, a modern dance performing arts group, has been the resident company at the Egg for 28 years.

In popular culture 
The Egg is the subject of a song by They Might Be Giants, entitled "Albany", which was written for their 2004 Venue Songs compilation album.
In 2013, Mike Gordon of Phish released a live album titled The Egg. The album was recorded live on December 11, 2011 at The Egg.
The Egg is the setting for indie rock singer-songwriter Mitski's 2021 music video for the single "Working for the Knife".
Notable artists who have performed at The Egg include; Chaka Khan, Dave Chappelle, Eric Burdon, Bebel Gilberto, WAR, David Byrne, Boz Scaggs, Margaret Cho, Buddy Guy, Leon Russell, the Mark Morris Dance Company, and New Riders of the Purple Sage.

See also
 Albany Convention Center
 Capital District Transportation Authority
 New York State Archives
 Port of Albany-Rensselaer

References

External links
 The Egg home page
 

Music venues completed in 1978
Buildings and structures in Albany, New York
Concert halls in New York (state)
Culture of Albany, New York
Empire State Plaza
Performing arts centers in New York (state)
Theatre in New York (state)
Theatres in New York (state)
Tourist attractions in Albany, New York
Theatres completed in 1978
1978 establishments in New York (state)